Maçaxı (also, Machakhi and Machakhy) is a village and municipality in the Ismailli Rayon of Azerbaijan.  It has a population of 136.

References 

Populated places in Ismayilli District